Ganna Khlistunova (also Hanna or Anna, ; born 27 February 1988) is a Ukrainian swimmer who won one bronze and two gold medals in the 100 m breaststroke at the 2006 European Aquatics Championships and 2007 World Aquatics Championships. She competed in the same event at the 2008 Summer Olympics, but did not reach the finals.

References

1988 births
Living people
Swimmers at the 2008 Summer Olympics
Female breaststroke swimmers
Ukrainian female swimmers
Olympic swimmers of Ukraine
European Aquatics Championships medalists in swimming
World Aquatics Championships medalists in swimming
Sportspeople from Rivne
21st-century Ukrainian women